Pseudopyrenidium is a genus of lichenicolous (lichen-dwelling) fungi in the family Adelococcaceae. The genus was circumscribed in 2010 by Père Navarro-Rosinés, Mikhail Zhurbenko, and Claude Roux. It has two species:

 Pseudopyrenidium epipertusariae  – host: Pertusaria pertusa
 Pseudopyrenidium tartaricola  – host: Ochrolechia

References

Verrucariales
Eurotiomycetes genera
Taxa described in 2010
Lichenicolous fungi
Taxa named by Claude Roux